Gypsy Beats and Balkan Bangers and its follow up Gypsy Beats and Balkan Bangers Too are two compilations of Eastern European-inspired music tracks, compiled by DJs Russ Jones and Felix Buxton (of Basement Jaxx). The album was released on Basement Jaxx's record label Atlantic Jaxx in 2006 (volume one) and 2007 (volume two).

Gypsy Beats and Balkan Bangers

Critical reception
BBC Music said of the first volume: "Sometimes, the marching programmed beats can be a touch insistent, but the wild wedding band vitality always remains untamed." Allmusic, in their 3/5 star review, said: "Overall, there is plenty to spin and take in, and being marred by a couple of cuts near the end spoils nothing. Check it." Pitchfork Media also called the compilation "excellent".

Track listing
 Bucovina - Shantel
 Mahalageasca - Mahala Rai Banda
 Bulgarian Chicks - Balkan Beat Box  
 Balkan Hot Step - N.O.H.A.  
 James Bond Theme - Fanfare Ciocărlia
 Usti Usti Baba - Kocani Orkestar & Señor Coconut  
 Spoitoresa - Mahala Rai Banda  
 Hora Andalusia - Fanfare Ciocărlia 
 Start Wearing Purple - Gogol Bordello  
 Mi Bori Sa Korani - Kocani Orkestar  
 Dostlar Bizim Halaya - Buzuki Orhan Osman & King Naat Veliov/Original Kocani Orkestar  
 Bucovina - Shantel
 Mahalageasca - Mahala Rai Banda  
 Epoitoresa - Mahala Rai Banda  
 Bucovina - Shantel

Gypsy Beats and Balkan Bangers Too

Track listing
 Sahib Balkan - Buscemi
 La Revedere - Dunkelbunt & Amsterdam Klezmer Band
 Super Good - Leningrad
 Mozzarella - Kal
 Goldregen - DelaDap
 Romano Hip Hop - gipsy.cz
 Sing Even If You Got No Bread - Haydamaky
 Daddy - Binder & Krieglstein
 Wedding Song - Boom Pam
 Hava Nagila - Municipale Balcanica
 Dobrij Aben - Russkaja
 Dunkelbunt Dub - Dunkelbunt & Amsterdam Klezmer Band
 Mozzarella - Kal
 Hava Nagila - Municipale Balcanica

References

2006 compilation albums
2007 compilation albums
Compilation album series
Worldbeat albums